A Time of Angels is a 2003 book by Patricia Schonstein and follows the lives of a number of Italian Jews in post-Apartheid South Africa.

Reception
The Guardian, in a review of A Time of Angels, wrote "Schonstein's magical realism is dense with sensual imagery - taste, touch, smell, shimmering visions. At first it is confusing to be recalled so insistently to the good things of life at the same time as being continuously reminded of horror and war; it seems almost shocking that Schonstein can list the ingredients of bostrengo - a delicious cake - and then, almost in the same breath, recount a massacre of children and old men.

However, this uneasy mixture is the whole point of Schonstein's narrative."

Other reviews have found it comparable to Like Water for Chocolate including Library Journal, Booklist, and Voice of Youth Advocates.

A Time of Angels has also been reviewed by Publishers Weekly, Kirkus Reviews, People magazine, and North & South magazine.

References

2003 novels
21st-century South African novels
Magic realism novels
Novels set in South Africa
Jews and Judaism in South Africa